Donald Frederick Hornig (March 17, 1920 – January 21, 2013) was an American chemist, explosives expert, teacher and presidential science advisor. He served as president of Brown University from 1970 to 1976.

Life and career
Hornig was born in Milwaukee, Wisconsin, the son of Chester Arthur Hornig and Emma Knuth. He attended Milwaukee Country Day School, then earned his undergraduate degree in chemistry from Harvard University. He was awarded his Ph.D. from Harvard University in 1943, at the age of 23, with a dissertation on An Investigation of the Shock Wave Produced by an Explosion in Air. On July 17, 1943 he was married to scientist Lilli Hornig. The couple had four children together: three girls, Joanna, Ellen, and Leslie, and one boy, Christopher.

After graduating, he started work at the Underwater Explosives Laboratory of the Woods Hole Oceanographic Institute. While there, according to one obituary, he received an invitation to begin a new job, but he was not told what his duties would be, nor, initially, to where he would relocate.  At first he refused, but Harvard University President James B. Conant helped persuade him to reconsider. Thus, he joined the Los Alamos Laboratory, where he was a group leader in the Manhattan Project. He worked on the firing unit that was used for the implosion of the plutonium device. He helped prepare the first atomic bomb, Trinity, and witnessed its explosion, the first detonation of a nuclear device.  He was sent up to the top of the tower twice the previous day to reassure a nervous Robert Oppenheimer that all was well.

In 1946 he joined the staff of Brown University as an assistant professor, and became a full professor in 1951. From 1951 to 1952 he was Associate Dean of the Graduate School, then acting dean the following year. In 1957 he became a member of the National Academy of Sciences and the same year he moved to Princeton University in 1957. Later became chairman of the Princeton chemistry department.

Shortly before President John F. Kennedy was assassinated in 1963, he announced Hornig as the presidential science advisor. Hornig assumed office on January 24, 1964, but did not enjoy good relations with the new president, Lyndon Baines Johnson, who enjoyed a poor relationship with many scientists. He left office at the end of the president's term in 1969, and accepted an executive position with Eastman Kodak Company.

In 1970 he became president of Brown University, and he remained in office until he resigned in 1976. The end of his term was noted for financial cutbacks at the university, which was met by student protests. Thereafter he became Professor of Chemistry in Public Health at Harvard University. From 1987 to 1990 he served the Harvard University School of Public Health as chairman of the Department of Environmental Health. He retired in 1990.

Since 2013, Hornig has been listed on the Advisory Council of the National Center for Science Education.

Hornig died from Alzheimer's disease in Providence, Rhode Island on January 21, 2013.

Awards and honors
 Winner of the Charles Lathrop Parsons Award of the American Chemical Society, 1967.
 Honorary LL.D from Boston College, November 12, 1966.
 Honorary D.Sc. from the University of Maryland, 1965.
 Honorary D.Sc. from Syracuse University, 1968.
 Member of the National Academy of Sciences.
 Member of the American Academy of Arts and Sciences.
 Member of the American Philosophical Society.
 Recipient of a Guggenheim Fellowship.
 Recipient of a Fulbright Fellowship.

References

External links
 Oral History Interview with Donald Hornig, from the Lyndon Baines Johnson Library
 Episode of The Memory Palace podcast about Horning's peculiar role during the first A-Bomb test

|-

1920 births
2013 deaths
American chemists
American educational theorists
Fellows of the American Physical Society
Harvard University alumni
Harvard University faculty
Manhattan Project people
Members of the United States National Academy of Sciences
Office of Science and Technology Policy officials
Presidents of Brown University